Llangollen was a rural district in the administrative county of Denbighshire, Wales, from 1894 to 1935.  
The rural district comprised part of the existing Corwen Rural Sanitary District, and consisted of three civil parishes:
Bryneglwys
Llangollen Rural			 
Llantysilio

The district was abolished by a County Review Order in 1935, most of the area passing to Wrexham Rural District, and a small part to Ruthin Rural District.

Sources
Denbighshire Administrative County (Vision of Britain)

History of Denbighshire
1894 establishments in Wales
Rural districts of Wales